In Group E of the UEFA Euro 2008 qualifying tournament, Croatia secured qualification to the finals on 17 November 2007 following Israel's 2–1 win against Russia, becoming the seventh team in the whole of the qualification stage to do so. Russia secured qualification to the tournament finals on 21 November 2007 following a 1–0 win against Andorra, and Croatia's 3–2 win against England, becoming the fourteenth and last team in the whole of the qualification stage to do so.

Standings

Matches 
Group E fixtures were negotiated at a meeting between the participants in Nyon, Switzerland, on 3 March 2006.

Goalscorers

References

External links
UEFA website

Group E
2006–07 in English football
2006–07 in Israeli football
2007–08 in Israeli football
2006 in Russian football
2007 in Russian football
Russia at UEFA Euro 2008
2006–07 in Croatian football
2007–08 in Croatian football
Croatia at UEFA Euro 2008
2006–07 in Andorran football
2007–08 in Andorran football
2006 in Estonian football
2007 in Estonian football
2006–07 in Republic of Macedonia football
2007–08 in Republic of Macedonia football